Kitchener Centre is a provincial electoral district in Ontario, Canada, that has been represented in the Legislative Assembly of Ontario since 1999.

Geography
The district includes the north-central part of the city of Kitchener, Ontario.

History
The provincial electoral district was created in 1996 from parts of Kitchener and Kitchener—Wilmot when provincial ridings were defined to have the same borders as federal ridings.

Members of Provincial Parliament

Election results

2007 electoral reform referendum

References

Sources
Elections Ontario Past Election Results

External links
Map of riding for 2018 election

Ontario provincial electoral districts
Politics of Kitchener, Ontario